is a railway station on the Ube Line in Ube, Yamaguchi Prefecture, Japan, operated by West Japan Railway Company.

Lines
Kusae Station is served by the Ube Line.

Railway stations in Yamaguchi Prefecture
Railway stations in Japan opened in 1923